National Baseball Association may refer to:

 National Baseball Association (circa 1933), established in England by Sir John Moores—see Baseball in the United Kingdom
 National Association of Base Ball Players (1857–1870), the governing body of early high-level but officially non-professional baseball
 National Association of Professional Base Ball Players (1871–1875), regarded by baseball historians as the first professional baseball league
 National Association (1879–1880), successor to the International Association after it lost its final Canadian team
 National Association of Professional Baseball Leagues, the former name of the governing body of Minor League Baseball, established in 1901

See also
 NBA (disambiguation)